G protein-coupled receptor 137B also known as GPR137B is a G protein-coupled receptor which in humans is encoded by the GPR137B gene. The expression of GPR137B is upregulated during kidney development.

References

G protein-coupled receptors